Cedrick Rommel Frazier (born April 28, 1979) is an American attorney and politician serving as a member of the Minnesota House of Representatives. A member of the Minnesota Democratic–Farmer–Labor Party (DFL), he represents District 43A, which includes the cities of New Hope and Crystal in Hennepin County.

Early life, education, and career 

After graduating from high school in Chicago, Illinois, Frazier moved to Minnesota to play NCAA football and run track at the University of Minnesota-Morris, graduating with a B.A. in psychology. Frazier went on to attend Minnesota State University, Mankato, where he served as a fellow with the United States Department of Housing and Urban Development, graduating with a M.A. in urban studies with an emphasis in local government management. After earning his M.A., Frazier enrolled at William Mitchell College of Law. In law school, Frazier joined Phi Beta Sigma and clerked for the Hennepin County Public Defender's Office in Minneapolis as well as the League of Minnesota Cities in its Municipal Law Litigation Department. After graduating with a J.D and passing the bar exam, he began his legal career as a public defender in Hennepin County. In 2008, Frazier accepted the position of Director of Equity and Diversity for the Minneapolis Public School District and was later promoted to legal counsel for the district. After spending eight years in public education, Frazier joined the legal team at Education Minnesota, the state's largest labor union.

New Hope City Council 

In August 2018, Frazier was appointed to the New Hope City Council, replacing Erik Lammle, who moved out of New Hope. Before his appointment, Frazier served on the city's Planning Commission. Frazier was sworn in on September 10, 2018, and became the first African American to serve on the New Hope City Council.

While a member of the council, Frazier encouraged engagement and dialogue between the City's Human Rights Commission and police department on policing practices. He also proposed ordinances related to protecting tenants of affordable housing units.

Minnesota House of Representatives 

Frazier was first elected to the Minnesota House of Representatives in 2020, succeeding longtime Minnesota State Representative Lyndon Carlson.

Tenure

On January 1, 2021, Minnesota House Speaker Melissa Hortman appointed Frazier vice chair of the House Public Safety Committee.

Frazier advocated for reform in Minnesota's public safety and criminal justice system. Minnesota had recently seen notable cases where Black men, including George Floyd and Daunte Wright, were killed during encounters with law enforcement. Frazier was described as a key budget negotiator in the politically divided legislature as it passed a $52 billion state budget, averting a potential state government shutdown. Minnesota Governor Tim Walz credited him with helping keep police reform front and center during the legislative session.

On July 13, 2021, Hortman appointed Frazier to serve on a select panel to determine the distribution of $250 million included in the Minnesota state budget dedicated to frontline workers. The funding was made possible by one-time federal funds from the American Rescue Plan Act of 2021. Frazier was Chief Author of the Essential Workers Emergency Leave Act, the original legislation that aimed to provide emergency paid sick leave to employees excluded from federal Families First Coronavirus Response Act.

On September 1, 2021, Hennepin County Attorney Mike Freeman announced that he would retire at the end of his term after 24 years in the role. Frazier became widely seen as a potential candidate for the position. But after expressing interest in it, Frazier announced that he had concluded that 2022 was not the right time for him to run for Hennepin County Attorney. On December 6, 2021, Frazier endorsed former Hennepin County chief public defender Mary Moriarty for Hennepin County Attorney.

On December 13, 2022, Frazier was elected co-chair of the Minnesota House People of Color and Indigenous (POCI) Caucus along with Representative Esther Agbaje.

Committee assignments
2023-2025 
Judiciary Finance & Civil Law (vice chair)
Education Policy 
Public Safety Finance & Policy
Workforce Development Finance & Policy 
2021-2023 
Public Safety Finance & Policy (vice chair)
Judiciary Finance & Policy
Education Policy 
Economic Development Finance & Policy

Elections

Personal life 

Frazier and his wife, Stella, have three daughters. Their family resides in New Hope, Minnesota.

References 

Democratic Party members of the Minnesota House of Representatives
University of Minnesota Morris alumni
Minnesota State University, Mankato alumni
William Mitchell College of Law alumni
University of St. Thomas (Minnesota) faculty
Lawyers from Chicago
Politicians from Chicago
People from New Hope, Minnesota
1979 births
Living people
African-American city council members in Minnesota
African-American state legislators in Minnesota
21st-century American lawyers
African-American lawyers
Minnesota lawyers
20th-century African-American people
21st-century African-American politicians
21st-century American politicians
Public defenders